Binayi Tribeni Rural Municipality (Nepali :विनयी त्रिवेणी गाउँपालिका) is a Gaunpalika in Nawalpur District in Gandaki Province of Nepal. On 12 March 2017, the government of Nepal implemented a new local administrative structure, with the implementation of the new local administrative structure, VDCs have been replaced with municipal and Village Councils. Binayi Tribeni is one of these 753 local units.

References 

Nawalpur District
Gandaki Province
Rural municipalities of Nepal established in 2017
Rural municipalities in Nawalpur District